is a Japanese photojournalist. She graduated from Keio University, worked as an announcer, and studied under a Fulbright scholarship at Columbia University.

References

Nihon shashinka jiten / 328 Outstanding Japanese Photographers. Kyoto: Tankōsha, 2000. .  Despite the English-language alternative title, all in Japanese.

Japanese photographers
1938 births
Living people
Japanese women photographers